College of Statistical and Actuarial Sciences is a constituent college of the University of the Punjab in Lahore.

History
The subject of Statistics was introduced in 1941 in the University. The college was established as the Department of Statistics in 1950 by Dr. M. Zia ud Din. The department was raised to the status of an Institute in 1952 and renamed to its current name in 2007.

References

University of the Punjab
1950 establishments in Pakistan
Universities and colleges in Lahore